Jean de Vienne (1341-1396) was a French admiral.

Jean de Vienne may also refer to:

Jean de Vienne (governor) (died 1351), governor of Calais and uncle of the admiral
Jean de Vienne (archbishop, died 1351), bishop of Avranches and Thérouanne and archbishop of Reims
Jean de Vienne (archbishop, died 1382), bishop of Metz and Basel and archbishop of Besançon
French cruiser  Jean de Vienne (launched 1935)
French frigate Jean de Vienne (launched 1981)